Whitchurch & Tongwynlais is an electoral ward of Cardiff, Wales.  It covers some or all of the following areas: Coryton, Tongwynlais and Whitchurch in the parliamentary constituency of Cardiff North.  It is bounded by Caerphilly county borough to the north; Rhiwbina and Heath to the east; Llandaff North to the south; Radyr & Morganstown and Pentyrch to the west.

Government

Senedd
Whitchurch & Tongwynlais is in the Cardiff North constituency for the Senedd. Since 2011 it has been represented by Julie Morgan MS, a member of the Labour Party

Houses of Parliament
The Westminster constituency of Cardiff North was represented by the Conservative Party's Craig Williams MP until the 2017 election, when Labour's Anna McMorrin won the seat.

Local Government
The ward has elected four councillors to the post-1996 Cardiff Council and, prior to that, four (Conservative) councillors to Cardiff City Council since the ward's creation in 1983.

References 

Cardiff electoral wards
1983 establishments in Wales